State Route 598 (SR 598) is a  north–south state highway in the northern portion of the U.S. state of Ohio. The southern terminus of SR 598 is at a signalized intersection where it meets SR 19, SR 61 and SR 309 in Galion.

Route description

Along its path, SR 598 travels through eastern Crawford County, northwestern Richland County and southwestern Huron County.  SR 598 is not included as a part of the National Highway System (NHS).  The NHS is a network of routes identified as being most important for the economy, mobility and defense of the nation.

History
SR 598 was applied on April 15, 1937 to a former county road.  The highway was originally routed along its present alignment from its southern terminus in Galion to its junction with SR 98 northeast of Tiro.  One year later, SR 598 was extended to the northeast along a previously un-numbered roadway, then northerly along a brief overlap of SR 61 and a short state highway that had carried the SR 289 designation to its current northern terminus at what was then the predecessor to SR 103, SR 194.

Major intersections

See also

References

External links

598
598
598
598